Bangladeshi Idol is a Bangladeshi reality television singing competition produced and distributed by Delta Bay Production & Distribution Pvt. Ltd. It started airing on SA TV, a new private satellite television channel in Bangladesh as an addition to the Idol franchise based on the original UK show Pop Idol. Imtu Ratish was the host. The show was won by Mong u Ching Marma.

References

Further reading
 
 
 

2012 Bangladeshi television series debuts
2010s Bangladeshi television series
Bangladeshi music television shows
Bangladeshi reality television series
Bengali-language television programming in Bangladesh
Idols (franchise)
Non-British television series based on British television series